The Year of the Voyager is a double DVD/CD released by Nevermore. It was released in Europe on October 20, 2008 and in North America on November 25, 2008 via Century Media. The set covers the This Godless Endeavor touring cycle, starting with live footage from the U.S. Gigantour 2005, the Metal Mania festival 2006 in Poland, the Wacken Open Air festival in 2006 in Germany and the main DVD show recorded at the Zeche in Bochum, Germany. Bonus material includes two songs from Century Media USA 10th Anniversary Party 2001, all promo videos and an interview with singer Warrel Dane which was recorded at the Roax Film Studios in Berlin in the spring of 2008.

The Year of the Voyager was released as a limited-edition 2DVD+2CD, standard 2DVD, standard 2CD and limited 3LP (the latter two containing the audio from the main show in Bochum only).

DVD

Disc 1

Zeche in Bochum, Germany (October 11, 2006)
 "Intro"
 "Final Product"
 "My Acid Words"
 "What Tomorrow Knows/Garden of Grey"
 "Next in Line"
 "Enemies of Reality"
 "I, Voyager"
 "The Politics of Ecstasy"
 "The River Dragon Has Come"
 "I Am the Dog"
 "Dreaming Neon Black"
 "Matricide"
 "Dead Heart in a Dead World"
 "Noumenon (From Tape)"
 "Inside Four Walls"
 "The Learning"
 "Sentient 6"
 "Narcosynthesis"
 "The Heart Collector"
 "Born"
 "This Godless Endeavor"

Disc 2

Gigantour, Bell Centre, Montreal, Canada (September 2, 2005)
 "Born"
 "Enemies of Reality"

Metal Mania Festival, Poland (March 4, 2006)
 "Final Product"
 "The Heart Collector"
 "Enemies of Reality"
 "The Seven Tongues of God"

Wacken Open Air, Germany (August 4, 2006)
 "Final Product"
 "Narcosynthesis"
 "Engines of Hate"
 "Born"

Century Media USA 10th Anniversary Party, The Roxy, Los Angeles (September 28, 2001)
 "Engines of Hate"
 "Beyond Within"

Promotional videos
 "What Tomorrow Knows"
 "Next in Line"
 "Believe in Nothing"
 "I, Voyager"
 "Enemies of Reality"
 "Final Product"
 "Born"
 "Narcosynthesis"

Trailers
 Nevermore – "The Year of the Voyager"
 Paradise Lost – "Over the Madness"
 Strapping Young Lad – "1994–2006 Chaos Years"

CD
Disc 1
 "Final Product"
 "My Acid Words"
 "What Tomorrow Knows/Garden of Grey"
 "Next in Line"
 "Enemies of Reality"
 "I, Voyager"
 "The Politics of Ecstasy"
 "The River Dragon Has Come"
 "I Am the Dog"
 "Dreaming Neon Black"

Disc 2
 "Matricide"
 "Dead Heart in a Dead World"
 "Inside Four Walls"
 "The Learning"
 "Sentient 6"
 "Narcosynthesis"
 "The Heart Collector"
 "Born"
 "This Godless Endeavor"

Band lineup

Bochum & Wacken
Warrel Dane – vocals
Jeff Loomis – guitar
Chris Broderick – guitar
Jim Sheppard – bass
Van Williams – drums

Gigantour & Metal Mania
Warrel Dane – vocals
Jeff Loomis – guitar
Steve Smyth – guitar
Jim Sheppard – bass
Van Williams – drums

Live at The Roxy
Warrel Dane – Vocals
Jeff Loomis – Guitar
Curran Murphy – Guitar
Jim Sheppard – Bass
Van Williams – Drums

External links
Nevermore's official website

Nevermore albums
2008 live albums
2008 video albums
Live video albums
Century Media Records live albums
Century Media Records video albums